It's a Miracle is a television show that aired on PAX TV between September 6, 1998 and August 12, 2006. Initially hosted by Billy Dean and Nia Peeples and then  Richard Thomas, and later by Roma Downey, it explored case studies of people who experienced perceived miracles during their lifetime. This included stories of a pet that saved lives of family members, and the success of someone who born -drug addicted and abandoned. The show also covered the near death of a surfer who was in high water wells when they were knocked unconscious by their surf board.

The show format could be altered to fit into half-hour or hour-long slots, varying the number of case studies shown in each episode as needed.

The show currently is shown in Europe, Africa and the Middle East on Zone Reality. It is also available on Amazon Prime Video.

References

External links 
 

1998 American television series debuts
2004 American television series endings
Television series about Christianity
PAX TV original programming
Television series featuring reenactments